Mühlkreis may refer to:
 See Mühlviertel
 Aigen im Mühlkreis, municipality in the district of Rohrbach in Upper Austria
 Allerheiligen im Mühlkreis, municipality in the district Perg in Upper Austria
 Hagenberg im Mühlkreis, town in the district of Freistadt in Upper Austria in Austria
 Haibach im Mühlkreis, municipality in the district of Urfahr-Umgebung in Upper Austria
 Hirschbach im Mühlkreis, municipality in the district of Freistadt in Upper Austria
 Hofkirchen im Mühlkreis, municipality in the district of Rohrbach in Upper Austria
 Kleinzell im Mühlkreis, municipality in the district of Rohrbach in Upper Austria
 Lembach im Mühlkreis, municipality in the district of Rohrbach in Upper Austria
 Lichtenau im Mühlkreis, municipality in the district of Rohrbach in Upper Austria
 Mühlkreis Autobahn (A7) is 27 km motorway (or Autobahn) in upper Austria
 Neumarkt im Mühlkreis, municipality in the district of Freistadt in Upper Austria
 Neustift im Mühlkreis, municipality in the district of Rohrbach in Upper Austria
 Ottenschlag im Mühlkreis, municipality in the district of Urfahr-Umgebung in Upper Austria
 Pfarrkirchen im Mühlkreis, municipality in the district of Rohrbach in Upper Austria
 Rainbach im Mühlkreis, municipality in the district of Freistadt in Upper Austria
 Reichenau im Mühlkreis, municipality in the district of Urfahr-Umgebung in Upper Austria
 Sankt Gotthard im Mühlkreis, municipality in the district of Urfahr-Umgebung in Upper Austria
 Sankt Martin im Mühlkreis, municipality in the district of Rohrbach in Upper Austria
 Sankt Ulrich im Mühlkreis, municipality in the district of Rohrbach in Upper Austria
 Sankt Veit im Mühlkreis, municipality in the district of Rohrbach in Upper Austria
 Schönau im Mühlkreis, municipality in the district of Freistadt in Upper Austria
 Sonnberg im Mühlkreis, municipality in the district of Urfahr-Umgebung in Upper Austria